Open Hatch General Cargo, abbreviated (OHGC), is a ship designed to transport forest products, bulk cargos, unitized cargoes, project cargoes and containers.

Description 
The vessel is typically fitted with two Gantry cranes for self-loading and unloading, with a typical SWL (safe working load) between 30 and 80 tons. Different equipment is connected to the gantry crane depending on cargo type as vacuum clamps for paper, unihook for unitised cargo, container frame and grab for bulk cargoes. Cargo holds are box shaped to fit containers and some holds can be equipped with tweendecks to improve flexibility of cargo mixture in same hold. Holds are typically equipped with dehumidifier for sensitive cargo. Cargo hatch covers for holds are opened and closed by mean of gantry crane. Space on those hatch covers can also be used to carry containers, lumber or project cargoes.

References

Notes

Sources
Sawyer, L.A. and W.H. Mitchell. Victory ships and tankers: The history of the ‘Victory’ type cargo ships and of the tankers built in the United States of America during World War II, Cornell Maritime Press, 1974, 0-87033-182-5.

Ship types